Dmitry Sergeyvich Sotnikov (born 29 May 1985) is a Russian rally raid driver who specializes in the truck category. He is a two-time Dakar Rally and a three-time Silk Way Rally champion.

Career
Sotnikov made his Dakar Rally debut in the 2014 edition, finishing in 4th position in the general classification; in the following edition he obtained the 5th position. In Dakar 2017, he achieved his best performance at the time, finishing in second position behind his Kamaz Master teammate Eduard Nikolaev. His best performance on that event happened in 2021 and 2022, when at the end he finished first with five stage wins in both events.

Other events outside the Dakar Rally include his victories in the Silk Way Rally in the 2013, 2017, 2021 and 2022 editions.

Dakar Rally results

Winner
Dakar Rally: 2021, 2022
Silk Way Rally: 2013, 2017, 2021, 2022
Gold of Kagan: 2015
Africa Race: 2013
Kazakhstan Rally: 2019

References

External links
Profile on Dakar Rally
Profile on Kamaz Master

1985 births
Living people
People from Naberezhnye Chelny
Russian rally drivers
Off-road racing drivers
Rally raid truck drivers
Dakar Rally drivers
Dakar Rally winning drivers
Sportspeople from Tatarstan